WKJT 102.3 FM is a radio station broadcasting a country music format, licensed to Teutopolis, Illinois and serving the Effingham, Illinois area. WKJT is owned by Gayla Jo Ring, through licensee Premier Broadcasting Inc.

References

External links
WKJT's official website

Country radio stations in the United States
KJT